The 1998–99 Nashville Predators season was the team's inaugural season. The team accumulated 28 wins and 47 losses, with seven games ending in ties for a total of 63 points, finishing in fourth place in the Central Division and 12th in the Western Conference. The team failed to qualify for the Stanley Cup playoffs.

Off-season
In the expansion draft, the Predators chose five goaltenders, including Mike Dunham and Tomas Vokoun, who would become their starting goaltenders, and Mike Richter, who was a free agent and chose not to sign with the Predators. In the 1998 NHL Entry Draft, the Predators chose David Legwand, a center, as their first-ever draft pick, second overall.

Regular season
The Predators struggled on the power-play during the regular season, finishing 27th overall in the NHL in power-play goals scored (40). They also had the lowest penalty-kill percentage in the league, at 78.99%.

Season standings

Game log

Player stats

Regular season
Scoring

Goaltending

Awards and records

Transactions
This section will cover signings from January 1, 1998, until the end of the 1998-1999 season.

Free agent signings
Nashville signed the following free agents between June and September 1998: Jayson More (June 4), Tom Fitzgerald (July 6), David Gosselin (July 9), Jeff Staples (July 16), Brad Smyth (July 16), Jamie Heward (Aug. 6), Andrew Brunette (Sept. 2), Vitali Yachmenev (Sept. 2), Sebastien Bordeleau (Sept. 3) and Sergei Krivokrasov (Sept. 11).

All season trades

Draft picks

Expansion draft

These results are numbered 1–26 for aesthetic purposes, but the players were not necessarily chosen in this order.  As the Predators were the only team participating in the draft, the order is inconsequential.

Entry draft
All clubs are in North America unless noted

References
Bibliography
 
 
 Predators on Hockey Database

Nashville Predators seasons
N
N